Přistoupim is a municipality and village in Kolín District in the Central Bohemian Region of the Czech Republic. It has about 400 inhabitants.

History
The first written mention of Přistoupim is in a document that originated between 1140 and 1148.

References

Villages in Kolín District